Clematis microphylla (Small-leaved Clematis) is one of 8 Clematis species native to Australia. It occurs in all states and the ACT, but not in the Northern Territory.

It is a common, quick-growing, small-leaved climbing species which prefers full sun and good drainage. It is very frost tolerant (-5 degrees Celsius). There are two variants, 
Clematis microphylla var. microphylla, leaves over 20 mm long and 3 mm wide

Clematis microphylla var. leptophylla, leaves less than 20 mm long and 3 mm wide - a medium sided climber with cream-green flowers through spring followed by bearded fruit.

References
PlantNET
Australian Native Plants Society Canberra Region Inc., Australian Plants: for Canberra region gardens and other cool climate areas, 4th Edn, 2001.

Flora of New South Wales
Flora of Queensland
Flora of South Australia
Flora of Tasmania
Flora of Victoria (Australia)
Eudicots of Western Australia
microphylla